In enzymology, a glutamate-5-semialdehyde dehydrogenase is an enzyme that catalyzes the chemical reaction

L-glutamate 5-semialdehyde + phosphate + NADP+  L-glutamyl 5-phosphate + NADPH + H+

The 3 substrates of this enzyme are L-glutamate 5-semialdehyde, phosphate, and NADP+, whereas its 3 products are L-glutamyl 5-phosphate, NADPH, and H+.

This enzyme belongs to the family of oxidoreductases, specifically those acting on the aldehyde or oxo group of donor with NAD+ or NADP+ as acceptor.  The systematic name of this enzyme class is L-glutamate-5-semialdehyde:NADP+ 5-oxidoreductase (phosphorylating). Other names in common use include beta-glutamylphosphate reductase, gamma-glutamyl phosphate reductase, beta-glutamylphosphate reductase, glutamate semialdehyde dehydrogenase, and glutamate-gamma-semialdehyde dehydrogenase.  This enzyme participates in urea cycle and metabolism of amino groups.

Structural studies

References 

 

EC 1.2.1
NADPH-dependent enzymes
Enzymes of known structure